Ghost in a Teeny Bikini is a 2006 American made for cable erotic film directed by Fred Olen Ray.

Plot
While shooting for a film directed by her boyfriend, Ted Wood Jr., Muffin Baker learns from a telegram that her rich uncle, Cyrus, has died. Together they travel to the estate of the deceased, where her last will is to be read. The lawyer, Archibald Weisenheimer, and her daughter, Evilyn, put plans together to murder Muffin Baker and claim the inheritance for themselves. Unknown to them, however, the property is haunted by the ghost of Tabitha, who becomes friendly to Muffin Baker and helps her. Weisenheimer tries desperately to kill the heir, leaving Evilyn to sleep with Ted.

In the last testament of the late Uncle Cyrus, it is revealed that a box of his assets and the associated key were hidden in his property. Muffin then returns to her room to take a nap. In her dreams, the ghost of Tabitha appears and seduces her. After her nap, Muffin realizes where she has to look for the chest and the key. However, when Weisenheimer and Evilyn threaten to steal the money, Tabitha reappears and saves Muffin. Weisenheimer confesses that he murdered Muffin's uncle. A policeman, fetched by Ted, arrives to arrest Weisenheimer. Ted and Muffin finally forgive each other.

Cast
 Christine Nguyen as Muffin Baker
 Nicole Sheridan as Tabitha, The Ghost
 Alexandre Boisvert as Ted Wood Jr.
 Brad Bartram as Archibald Weisenheimer
 Evan Stone as Marsh
 Rebecca Love as Evilyn
 Syren as Madame Zola
 Michelle Lay as Fuscia

Background
The film was produced by the production company American Independent Productions. The film was shot simultaneously with Bikini Girls from the Lost Planet. It was broadcast several times in Summer 2006 at fixed times and on demand on the premium channel Cinemax. It was released on DVD on August 6, 2006.

The building, in which a large part of the film was shot, also served as a filming location for the movie Voodoo Dollz.

Reception
Dr. Gore's Movie Reviews praised the film in a review for the humor and the variety with three songs that are sung in the film. The best performers are found to be Evan Stone and Rebecca Love. The humorous songs and Evan Stone's role were evaluated positive, but Christine Nguyen was identified as the best actress in the film. Ghost in a Teeny Bikini had a B-movie average and was rated as highly recommended. The film was given 8 out of 10.

Mitch Lovell of The Video Vacuum, however, had a rather negative assessment of the film. He said that the sex scenes were mostly terrible. Unlike other critics, he also criticized the songs as a particularly low point.

References

External links
 
 
 
 

2006 television films
2006 films
2000s erotic films
Cinemax original films
Films directed by Fred Olen Ray
American erotic horror films
2000s English-language films
2000s American films